The events of 1983 in anime.

Events
The first original video animation (OVA), Dallos, is released.

Accolades 
Ōfuji Noburō Award: Barefoot Gen

Releases

See also
1983 in animation

References

External links 
Japanese animated works of the year, listed in the IMDb

Anime
Anime
Years in anime